The Thunder Bay Bearcats were a Junior "A" ice hockey team from Thunder Bay, Ontario, Canada.  They were a part of the Superior International Junior Hockey League.

History
The team was founded in 2001 with the Superior International Junior Hockey League as the K&A First Nations Featherman Hawks.  After one season they moved to Nipigon and became Nipigon Featherman Hawks. The next season they moved back to Thunder Bay and became the K&A First Nations Golden Hawks.

In 2006, the team was bought and renamed the Thunder Bay Bearcats.  The Bearcats moniker was a prominent team name in the region in the 1950s.

In 2008, the Bearcats absorbed the Thunder Bay Bulldogs to resurrect and improve the city's Thunder Bay Kings Midget AAA program.

In May 2009, the Bearcats did not attend the league's AGM and it soon came out that the team was disbanding.

Season-by-Season results

Playoffs
2002 Lost Semi-final
Dryden Ice Dogs defeated Nipigon Featherman Hawks 4-games-to-none
2003 DNQ
2004 DNQ
2005 Lost Semi-final
Fort William North Stars defeated K&A Golden Hawks 4-games-to-none
2006 Lost Semi-final
Fort William North Stars defeated K&A Golden Hawks 4-games-to-none
2007 Lost Semi-final
Schreiber Diesels defeated Thunder Bay Bearcats 4-games-to-2
2008 Lost Semi-final
Thunder Bay Bearcats defeated Thunder Bay Bulldogs 3-games-to-none
Fort William North Stars defeated Thunder Bay Bearcats 4-games-to-1
2009 Lost Final
Thunder Bay Bearcats defeated Fort Frances Jr. Sabres 4-games-to-1
Fort William North Stars defeated Thunder Bay Bearcats 4-games-to-1

Defunct Superior International Junior Hockey League teams
Sport in Thunder Bay